Dato’ Eddin Syazlee bin Shith (Jawi: عيدين شاذلي بن شيث) is a Malaysian politician who served as Deputy Minister in the Prime Minister's Department in charge of Economic Affairs in the Barisan Nasional (BN) administration under former Prime Minister Ismail Sabri Yaakob and former Minister Mustapa Mohamed from August 2021 to the collapse of the BN administration in November 2022, Deputy Minister of Works in the Perikatan Nasional (PN) administration under former Prime Minister Muhyiddin Yassin and former Minister Fadillah Yusof from July 2020 to the collapse of the PN administration in August 2021, the Deputy Minister in the Prime Minister's Department in charge of Parliament and Law in the PN administration under Muhyiddin and former Minister Takiyuddin Hassan from March 2020 to July 2020, Deputy Minister of Communications and Multimedia in the Pakatan Harapan (PH) administration under former Prime Minister Mahathir Mohamad and former Minister Saifuddin Abdullah from July 2018 to February 2020 and the Member of Parliament (MP) for Kuala Pilah from May 2018 to November 2022. He is a member and the State Chairman of Negeri Sembilan of the Malaysian United Indigenous Party (BERSATU), a component party of the PN and formerly PH coalitions.

Background
Born on 2 January 1974, in Kuala Pilah, Negeri Sembilan, he started his career as a lawyer before venturing into the political arena in 2006.

Eddin Syazlee holds a Bachelor of Law (Hons) degree from the Universiti Teknologi MARA (UiTM) (2003), Masters in Law from Universiti Kebangsaan Malaysia (2009), and Diploma in Syariah Legal Practice from UiTM (2017).

He is married to Dr Nurul Azlin Ibrahim and the couple is blessed with two sons, aged five and one.

Political career
In the 14th General Election, he contested under PKR ticket, defeating the three-term Kuala Pilah incumbent, Datuk Seri Hasan Malek.

Controversies
In April 2021, Eddin Syazlee was embroiled in controversy when he was caught falling asleep during a convocation ceremony of a religious college in Seremban, of which he was the guest-of-honour. The local branch of his party BERSATU has since clarified that it was due to health reasons.

Election results

Honours
  :
  Knight Commander of the Order of Loyalty to Negeri Sembilan (DPNS) – Dato' (2020)

References

External links

Living people
Malaysian United Indigenous Party politicians
Members of the Dewan Rakyat
Government ministers of Malaysia
Malaysian people of Malay descent
21st-century Malaysian politicians
1974 births